On the Fringe (simplified Chinese: 边缘少年) is a Singaporean Chinese drama which was telecast on Singapore's free-to-air channel, MediaCorp Channel 8. It made its debut on 18 Apr 1988. This drama serial consists of 25 episodes, and was screened on every weekday night at 9.30 pm.

Cast
Li Nanxing - The lead role was originally offered to Eric Moo but was rejected by him.
Chen Bifeng
Zheng Wanling
Duan Weiming
Yang Libing
Lin Meijiao 
Huang Yiliang
Zheng Geping
Weng Jiahong
Steven Woon
Dai Peng
Wang Xiuyun
Chen Juanjuan
Pan En
Liang Tian
Richard Low
Wu Weiqiang
Guan Xinyi
Cai Ducui
Li Yinzhu
Li Gongyu
Wang Changli
Chen Tianxiang
Zhu Zuquan
An Zheming
Huang Fa
Zeng Yaofeng
Liang Baozhu
Zhang Jinhua
Chen Meiguang
Yan Bingliang
Ye Shipin

References

Singapore Chinese dramas
Chinese-language television shows
1988 Singaporean television series debuts
1980s Singaporean television series
1988 Singaporean television series endings
Channel 8 (Singapore) original programming